Events from the year 1934 in Taiwan, Empire of Japan.

Incumbents

Central government of Japan
 Prime Minister: Saitō Makoto, Keisuke Okada

Taiwan
 Governor-General – Nakagawa Kenzō

Births
 1 July – Chen Kuei-miao, acting Mayor of Tainan (1985)
 25 August – Hsiao Teng-tzang, Ministry of Justice (1988–1989)
 24 December – Chen Chin-hsing, Magistrate of Hsinchu County (1981–1989)

References

 
1930s in Taiwan
Years of the 20th century in Taiwan